USS Wyoming was the second ship of the United States Navy to bear that name, but the first to bear it in honor of the 44th state.  The first Wyoming was named for Wyoming Valley in eastern Pennsylvania.

Wyoming was ordered on 4 May 1898, and awarded to the Union Iron Works, San Francisco, 5 October 1898. The keel of Monitor No. 10 was laid down on 11 April 1898. She was launched on 8 September 1900 sponsored by Miss Hattie Warren, daughter of Senator Francis E. Warren of Wyoming, and commissioned at the Mare Island Naval Shipyard, Vallejo, California, on 8 December 1902. The total cost for the hull, machinery, armor and armament was $1,624,270.59.

In 1909, the ship was renamed Cheyenne to free her original name for a new battleship and she was allocated the hull number M-10, which was altered to BM-10 in 1920 and ultimately IX-4 in 1921. She was ultimately sold for scrap in 1939.

Design

The s had been designed to combine a heavy striking power with easy concealment and negligible target area. She was manned by a total crew of 13 officers and 209 men.

Wyoming, the first ship in the fleet to be converted to oil power, was powered by two vertical triple expansion engines driving two screw propellers with steam generated by four Babcock & Wilcox boilers.

The ship was armed with a main battery of two /40 caliber guns, either Mark 3 or Mark 4, in a Mark 4 turret. The secondary battery consisted of four /50 caliber Mark 7 guns along with three 6-pounder  guns. Wyoming also had a  deck.

Service history

Wyoming
After fitting out at Mare Island, Wyoming ran her trials and exercises in San Pablo Bay and San Francisco Bay and conducted exercises and target practice off the southern California coast through the summer of 1903 before she headed south in the autumn, reaching Acapulco, Mexico, on 31 October. She subsequently shifted further south, to Colombia, where a civil war and a rebellion in the Panamanian territory instigated by the United States government, took part in the independence of the Panamanian territory from Colombia, to later build the Panama Canal. The monitor accordingly arrived in Panamanian waters on 13 November and sailed up the Tuira River in company with the protected cruiser , with a company of Marines under Lieutenant S.A.M. Patterson, USMC, and Lieutenant C.B. Taylor, USMC, embarked, to land at Yariza and observe the movements of Colombian troops.

The presence of American armed might there and elsewhere ultimately aided in independence for the Panamanians. During that time, Wyoming anchored at the Bay of San Miguel, Panama, on 15 December. The following day, a boat with 11 Marines embarked for the port of La Palma, Panama, under sail. While Boston departed the scene on 17 December, Wyoming shifted to La Palma on the following day. There, Lieutenant Patterson, USMC, with a detachment of 25 marines, commandeered the steamer Tuira and took her upriver. While the Marines were gone, a party of evacuated American nationals came out to the monitor in her gig. Meanwhile, Patterson's Marines had joined the ship's landing force at the village of Real to keep an eye on American interests there. Back at La Palma, Wyoming continued to take on board American nationals fleeing from the troubled land and kept up a steady stream of supplies to her landing party of bluejackets and Marines at Real. Ultimately, when the need for them had passed, the landing party returned to the ship on Christmas Eve. Wyoming remained in Panamanian waters into the spring of 1904 keeping a figurative eye on local conditions before she departed Panama Bay on 19 April, bound for Acapulco, Mexico. After remaining at that port from 27 to 29 April, Wyoming visited Pichilinque, Mexico from 3 to 9 May. She subsequently reached San Diego, on 14 May for a nine-day stay.

For the remainder of 1904, Wyoming operated off the West Coast, ranging from Brighton Beach, California, and Ventura, California, to Bellingham, Washington, and Portland, Oregon. She attended a regatta at Astoria, Oregon, from 22 to 27 August and later took part in ceremonies at the "unveiling of monuments" at Griffin Bay, San Juan Islands and Roche Harbor before she entered the Puget Sound Navy Yard, Bremerton, Washington, on 22 October. Wyoming was overhauled there into the following year. She departed the Pacific Northwest on 26 January 1905 and steamed via San Francisco to Magdalena Bay, Mexico, for target practice. Later cruising to Acapulco and Panamanian waters, Wyoming also operated off San Salvador and Port Harford, California, before she returned to Mare Island on 30 July to be decommissioned on 29 August 1905.

Recommissioned on 8 October 1908 with Commander John J. Knapp in command, Wyoming spent over two months at Mare Island refitting. Converted to fuel oil – the first ship to do so in the United States Navy – she underwent tests for her oil-burning installation at San Francisco, Santa Barbara, California, and San Diego, into March 1909. During those tests, Wyoming was renamed Cheyenne on 1 January 1909, in order to clear the name Wyoming for the projected Battleship No. 32. The ship consequently underwent more tests on her oil-burning equipment at Santa Barbara, San Pedro, and San Diego before she was placed in reserve at Mare Island on 8 June. She was decommissioned on 13 November of the same year.

Cheyenne
 

Recommissioned, in reserve, on 11 July 1910, Lieutenant Commander Charles Trusedale Owens in command, Cheyenne was assigned to the Washington Naval Militia in 1911 and operated in an "in commission, in reserve" status into 1913. Shifting to the Puget Sound Navy Yard early in February 1913, Cheyenne was fitted out as a submarine tender over the ensuing months. Finally, on 20 August 1913, Cheyenne was placed in "full commission". The newly converted submarine tender operated in the Puget Sound region until 11 December, when she sailed for San Francisco. In the ensuing months, Cheyenne tended the submarines of the Second Submarine Division, Pacific Torpedo Flotilla, at Mare Island, San Francisco, and San Pedro, into April 1914. Later that spring, when troubled conditions in Mexico threatened American lives and property, Cheyenne interrupted her submarine tending duties twice, once in late April and once in mid-May, to embark refugees at Ensenada, Mexico, and San Quentin, Mexico, transporting them both times to San Diego.

Cheyenne then resumed her submarine tending operations on the West Coast, continuing them into 1917. Subsequently, shifting to the Puget Sound Navy Yard, Cheyenne remained at that port for most of a month taking on stores and provisions loading ammunition and receiving men on board to fill the vacancies in her complement. On 28 April Cheyenne guarded  as she ran trials off Port Townsend, Washington. On 4 May, the warship returned to Puget Sound for drydock and yard work. Completing that refit late in May, Cheyenne shifted southward to San Pedro, Los Angeles, where she established a submarine base and training camp for personnel for submarine duty. Cheyenne subsequently joined the Atlantic Fleet, serving as flagship and tender for Division 3, Flotilla 1, Submarine Force, Atlantic Fleet. On 17 December 1918, the ship was transferred to Division 1, American Patrol Detachment. While with that force, Cheyenne lay at Tampico, Mexico, protecting American lives and property from 16 January to 9 October 1919. Proceeding north soon thereafter, the warship arrived at the Philadelphia Navy Yard on 23 October 1919, where she was decommissioned on 3 January 1920.

While inactive at Philadelphia, the ship was classified as a miscellaneous auxiliary, under the hull number IX-4, in the fleetwide designation of alphanumeric hull classification symbols of 17 July 1920. Subsequently, recommissioned at Philadelphia on 22 September of the same year, Cheyenne was towed to Baltimore, Maryland, by the tug . Based there, Cheyenne was assigned to training duty with Naval Reserve Force (USNRF) personnel of subdistrict "A" of the Fifth Naval District, and trained USNRF reservists through 1925. Based at Baltimore, she occasionally visited Hampton Roads during her cruises. On 21 January 1926, the minesweeper  took Cheyenne in tow and took her to Norfolk, Virginia, and thence to Philadelphia, where she arrived on 27 January for inactivation. Decommissioned on 1 June 1926, Cheyenne was struck from the Naval Vessel Register on 25 January 1937, and her stripped-down hulk was sold for scrap on 20 April 1939.

Notes

Bibliography

External links

Arkansas-class monitors
Ships built in San Francisco
1900 ships
World War I monitors of the United States
Ships built by Union Iron Works